Roscoe Parrish (born July 16, 1982) is a former American football wide receiver and kick returner. He was drafted by the Buffalo Bills of the National Football League (NFL) in the second round (55th overall) of the 2005 NFL Draft. He played college football at the University of Miami.

Collegiate career and early life
Parrish played quarterback at Miami Senior High.
He then attended the University of Miami and converted to the wide receiver position and finished his college career with 81 receptions. He is the cousin of NFL running back Branden Oliver.

Track and field
Parrish was also a track star at the University of Miami, where he ran the 60 meters, 100 meters and 200 meters, posting personal bests of 6.89 seconds, 10.65 seconds and 21.13 seconds, respectively.

He also competed in the 55 meters, posting a personal best time of 6.38 seconds.

Personal bests

Professional career

2005 NFL Combine

Buffalo Bills
The Buffalo Bills drafted Parrish in the second round (55th overall) during the 2005 NFL Draft.

2005 season
Parrish's NFL career with the Buffalo Bills got off to a slow start, with Parrish missing the first six games due to injury. Parrish played in a limited role for the next 10 games, finishing the 2005 season with 15 receptions for 148 yards (9.9 avg.) and one touchdown. He also returned several punts and kickoffs for the team.

2006 season
Parrish served as the Bills fourth wide receiver. Parrish finished the year with 23 receptions for 320 yards (13.9 avg.) and 2 touchdowns. As a punt returner, Parrish gained 364 yards on 32 attempts (11.4 avg.) and one score. 

Parrish's finest moment came when he ran back an 82-yard punt return for a touchdown in a win against the Jacksonville Jaguars. In the same game, he caught a 30-yard pass from quarterback J. P. Losman to set up the Bills' game-winning field goal.

2007 season
Parrish returned his first punt return of the season for a touchdown against the Denver Broncos. He became the first player in the 2007 season to score a rushing touchdown, a receiving touchdown, and a punt return touchdown. For the second season in a row, Parrish finished the season with over 300 receiving yards and 360 total return yards, achieving 352 receiving yards on 35 receptions, 440 punt return yards, and 126 kickoff return yards.

2008 season
In the Bills seasons opener against the Seattle Seahawks, Parrish returned a punt return 63 yards for a touchdown. His return stats ultimately declined this year as he shared return responsibilities with rookie cornerback Leodis McKelvin. He caught 24 passes for 232 yards, receiving his lone touchdown against the Oakland Raiders to help the Bills win 24–23.

2009 season
Parrish's role as a receiver decreased in 2009 as the Bills signed superstar receiver Terrell Owens in the off-season, as he only caught 3 passes for 44 yards. Parrish had a notable blunder during a game against the Cleveland Browns, muffing a punt in the fourth quarter that set up the Browns' game-winning field goal in a low-scoring 6–3 affair.

2010-11 seasons
After the departures of both Owens and Josh Reed in free agency, Parrish resumed his role as a prominent receiver for the Bills. In just 8 games, he caught a career-high 400 receiving yards on 33 catches with two touchdowns before suffering a season-ending hand injury against the Chicago Bears that would require surgery. In week 2 of the following season, Parrish was injured again after catching his first and only reception of the year for 16 yards. The Bills placed him on injured reserve for the second year in a row.

San Diego Chargers
On April 3, 2012, Parrish signed with the San Diego Chargers, but was released on August 27, 2012.

Oakland Raiders
Later that same day, Parrish was signed by the Oakland Raiders, who needed a returner to fill in for a hurt Jacoby Ford. However, in the following preseason game against the Seattle Seahawks, Parrish fumbled both punt return attempts, did not see the field again, and was cut the following day.

Tampa Bay Buccaneers
On September 25, 2012, Parrish was signed by the Tampa Bay Buccaneers to replace Jordan Shipley as the team's kick returner. He retired after this season, finishing his career with over 1,500 receiving yards and nearly 2,700 return yards.

Legal issues
On August 12, 2019, Parrish was arrested in Fort Lauderdale, Florida with criminal charges of stalking and written threats to kill. He had allegedly begun harassing a former girlfriend and her daughter after the relationship ended in July 2018.

References

External links
Tampa Bay Buccaneers bio

1982 births
Living people
Players of American football from Miami
Miami Senior High School alumni
American football wide receivers
American football return specialists
Miami Hurricanes football players
Buffalo Bills players
Tampa Bay Buccaneers players